Ahnam Centre of Culture and Industry ( – Sherkat-e Kesht va Sanʿat Aḥnām) is a cultural centre and village in Hasanabad Rural District, Fashapuyeh District, Ray County, Tehran Province, Iran. At the 2006 census, its population was 17, in 4 families.

References 

Populated places in Ray County, Iran